William J. Young may refer to:

 W. J. Young (William John Young, 1827–1896), American industrialist, founder of the W.J. Young Company
 William John Young (pastoralist) (1850–1931), Australian company chief executive and station manager
 William John Young (biochemist) (1878–1942), English biochemist
 William J. Young (coach) (1881–1957), American college basketball and football coach